Guilty Trails is a 1938 American Western film written and directed by George Waggner. The film stars Bob Baker, Marjorie Reynolds, Wally Wales, Georgia O'Dell, Jack Rockwell and Carleton Young. The film was released on October 21, 1938, by Universal Pictures.

Plot

Cast        
Bob Baker as Bob Higgins
Marjorie Reynolds as Jackie Lawson
Wally Wales as Sundown Ansel
Georgia O'Dell as Aunt Martha Lawson
Jack Rockwell as Brad Eason
Carleton Young as Steve Yates
Forrest Taylor as Dan Lawson
Glenn Strange as Sheriff
Murdock MacQuarrie as Judge Howard

References

External links
 

1938 films
American Western (genre) films
1938 Western (genre) films
Universal Pictures films
Films directed by George Waggner
American black-and-white films
1930s English-language films
1930s American films